Loay Nasr  is a Syrian singer. whose diverse vocal ability and style have attracted a following from different countries in the Arab world.

Discography

Singles
 Khles El Saber Meni (2015)

Videography

References 

Living people
21st-century Syrian male singers
People from Aleppo
Year of birth missing (living people)